A national history museum or national historical museum is a history museum dedicated to presenting artifacts and exhibits reflecting the history of a particular nation, usually its home country. The earliest public museums, the Ashmolean Museum in Oxford and the Louvre Museum in Paris, were focused on natural history and art, respectively, and not necessarily on subjects related to the history of any nation. Following Napoleon's use of the Louvre as a center of national pride during his reign, other countries began to use museums not just to store artifacts of aesthetic or educational value, but to portray the country itself in a positive light.

Historically, some national history museums have been used purely as propaganda tools through which governments attempt to convey an official history. For example, "the Nazi regime employed the museum as a deliberate tool of propaganda and 'public education'". It has further been argued that "the very idea of an officially sponsored national history museum is simply outdated" in light of the trend towards pluralistic interpretation of artifacts. On the other hand, it has been argued that: "To create a national history museum that discards unitary national narratives as well as causal trajectories (the teleology of the nation)—in effect to subvert the form—is probably impossible". One concern of national history museums, therefore, is how to fairly and neutrally depict negative periods in a nation's own history.

Examples
National history museums include:
 Canadian Museum of History
Hungarian National Museum 
National History Museum in Slovakia, see Trebišov
National History Museum (1949-1959) in Beijing, see National Museum of China
National History Museum in India, part of the Government Museum and Art Gallery, Chandigarh
 Museo Histórico Nacional (Chile)
 Museo Nacional de Historia, Mexico
National History Museum (Malaysia)
 National Historical Museum (Albania)
 National Historical Museum (Argentina)
 National Historical Museum (Brazil)
 National Historical Museum (Bulgaria)
 National Historical Museum (Greece)
 National Historical Museum of Ukraine
 National Museum of American History, established in 1964 as the Museum of History and Technology, and renamed in 1980.
 St Fagans National History Museum in Wales

See also 
 List of national museums
 List of museums

References

Types of museums
National History Museum